Greencoat UK Wind is a British investment company investing in UK wind farms based in London, England. Established in 2012, it is listed on the London Stock Exchange and is a constituent of the FTSE 250 Index. The company's Chairman is Tim Ingram. Greencoat Capital LLP acts as investment manager to Greencoat  UK Wind plc.

References

External links
  Official site

Companies listed on the London Stock Exchange
Investment companies of the United Kingdom